The 2016 NCAA Division III men's basketball tournament was a single-elimination tournament involving 62 teams to determine the men's collegiate basketball national champion of National Collegiate Athletic Association (NCAA) Division III.  The tournament took place during March 2016, with the national semifinal and championship rounds taking place at the Salem Civic Center in Salem, Virginia.

St. Thomas (MN) defeated Benedictine University, 82–76, to win their second Division III national championship.

Qualifying teams

Automatic bids (43)

The following 43 teams were automatic qualifiers for the 2016 NCAA field by virtue of winning their conference's automatic bid (except for the UAA, whose regular-season champion received the automatic bid).

At-large bids (19)

The following 19 teams were awarded qualification for the 2016 NCAA field by the NCAA Division III Men's Basketball Committee. The committee evaluated teams on the basis of their win-loss percentage, strength of schedule, head-to-head results, results against common opponents, and results against teams included in the NCAA's final regional rankings.

Tournament bracket

Top-left - Lisle, Illinois

Bottom-left - Medford, Massachusetts

Top-right - Rock Island, Illinois

* – Denotes overtime period

Bottom-right - Oswego, New York

* – Denotes overtime period

Final Four - Salem, Virginia

Bracket: 
Records Book:

All-Tournament Team
Taylor Montero - St. Thomas (MN) (Most Outstanding Player) 
Ryan Saarela - St. Thomas (MN)
Grant Schafer - St. Thomas (MN)
Luke Johnson - Benedictine
Connor Green - Amherst

See also
2016 NCAA Division I men's basketball tournament
2016 NCAA Division II men's basketball tournament

References

NCAA Division III men's basketball tournament
Ncaa tournament
NCAA Division III Men's Basketball